Miguel Angel Rojas (born April 17, 1963) is an American former professional baseball player and current baseball manager. He played in Minor league baseball as a catcher from 1983 to 1984 for the Oakland Athletics and Toronto Blue Jays organizations. After his playing career, he continued his involvement in professional baseball as a coach and manager for several organizations. He is the current manager for the Northwest Arkansas Naturals of the Double-A Texas League and the Leones del Caracas of the Venezuelan Professional Baseball League.

Rojas is the son of former MLB second baseman, coach, manager and scout Octavio "Cookie" Rojas, still in baseball as a television analyst on the Miami Marlins' Spanish network. His  brother Victor is the TV play-by-play announcer for the Los Angeles Angels.

Baseball career
Rojas was born in Miami, Florida. He is a former catcher who played in the Oakland Athletics and Toronto Blue Jays farm systems during the 1980s. His Baseball-Reference page lists him as playing only in 1983–1984, but his mlb.com biography credits him with four years of minor league service, through 1986.

He piloted teams at the Short Season-A, Class A and Triple-A levels. However, Toledo was eliminated in the first round by the Durham Bulls. Rojas then became field coordinator for the Detroit farm system in 2008 and, later, director of player development.

He was named Detroit's MLB bullpen coach on July 3, 2011, when his predecessor, Jeff Jones, was promoted to Detroit's pitching coach position. Working under manager Jim Leyland, he served in that post until the end of the  season.

On November 3, 2016, Rojas was named the manager of the Toledo Mud Hens for the second time. In , a decade after his original Toledo assignment, he managed the Hens to a 70–71 record and a third place finish in the International League's West Division.

On March 7, 2017, Rojas was named the manager of the Leones del Caracas, for the 2017–2018 season.

In 2018, Rojas will spend his first season as a member of the Kansas City Royals' organization as their Double-A manager; his father, Cookie, appeared in 880 games for the Royals between 1970 and 1977, and made four American League All-Star teams as a second baseman.

References

External links

Mike Rojas official coaching bio on MLB.com

1963 births
Living people
Baseball players from Miami
Chattanooga Lookouts managers
Detroit Tigers coaches
Detroit Tigers executives
Gulf Coast Blue Jays players
Idaho Falls A's players
Major League Baseball bullpen coaches
Seattle Mariners coaches
Sports coaches from Miami
Sportspeople from Naples, Florida
Toledo Mud Hens managers
American expatriate baseball people in the Dominican Republic
American expatriate baseball people in Venezuela